The Builders Challenge  is a high-performance housing recognition initiative led by the U.S. Department of Energy (DOE) Office of Energy Efficiency and Renewable Energy through its Building Technologies Program. The voluntary program with incentives was announced by the DOE on 14 February 2008. Through the Builders Challenge, participating homebuilders can more easily differentiate their high energy-performance homes from other less energy-efficient products in the marketplace by means of a standardized energy rating system. “Best energy-performing” is defined by the DOE as scoring 70 or lower on the EnergySmart Home Scale (E-Scale), that is, at least 30 percent more efficient than a typical home built per the 2004 International Energy Conservation Code. The Builders Challenge aims for 1.3 million homes scoring 70 or lower to be constructed by 2030 thereby saving $1.7 billion in energy costs per DOE estimate.

"DOE's ultimate vision is that, by 2030, a consumer will have the opportunity to buy an affordable net zero energy home (NZEH) anywhere in the United States - a grid-connected home that, over the course of a year, produces as much energy as it uses.” 

The EnergySmart Home Scale provides a visible means of comparing the overall energy-efficiency of homes, analogous to fuel-economy ratings on new motor vehicles or Energy Star ratings on  major electrical appliances. Homes that meet or exceed the minimum standards of Builders Challenge receive an E-Scale sunburst sticker, alerting prospective buyers or renters to the home's energy performance.  For example, a 64 on the E-Scale indicates the home is approximately 36 percent more energy efficient than a typical new home built to code. “Builders may place the E-Scale on or near the home's electric panel to show potential homeowners the energy performance achieved by that particular home or model.” 

Builders can meet the Challenge through any one of three different pathways: performance, prescriptive, or partner/HERS provider. The Builders Challenge Quality Criteria and Technology Information Packets (followed under the prescriptive path) are based on over a decade of Building America’s building science R&D. Both the Builders Challenge and the Building America programs advance the ability to build cost-effective net zero and high performance homes.

Requirements for builders to meet the Builders Challenge here.

Individuals interested becoming a Builders Challenge third-party verifier can learn more here.

Dual Certification
The Builders Challenge program has formed partnerships with the nation’s leading green home labeling programs.
 National Green Building Standard homes can qualify for both programs using the free online Green Scoring Tool 
 EarthCraft House has aligned their Gold-level certification to meet the Builders Challenge.
 LEED for Homes
 Environments for Living

See also
EnergySmart Home Scale

References 

Energy conservation in the United States